Heisteria is a genus of plants in the family Olacaceae, although it is sometimes listed under the largely unrecognized family erythropalaceae. It contains the following species (this list may be incomplete):
 Heisteria acuminata 
 Heisteria asplundii Sleumer
 Heisteria concinna Standl.
 Heisteria costaricensis Donn. Sm.
 Heisteria cyathiformis Little
 Heisteria fatoensis Standl.
 Heisteria longipes Standl.
 Heisteria maguirei Sleumer
 Heisteria pallida Engl.
 Heisteria parvifolia Sm.

References

External links

Olacaceae
Santalales genera
Taxonomy articles created by Polbot